Brian Knutson is a professor of psychology and neuroscience at Stanford University and director of the Symbiotic Project on Affective Neuroscience. His research focuses on the neural basis of emotion, and has been covered in multiple news sources.

Education 
He earned a dual bachelor's degree in psychology and comparative religion from Trinity University in 1989 and a Ph.D. in psychology from Stanford University in 1993.

Publications 
He has published over 100 peer-reviewed articles which have received over 20,000 citations.  His most cited work, "Anticipation of Increasing Monetary Reward Selectively Recruits Nucleus Accumbens", was published in Journal of Neuroscience in 2001.

References

External links 
 Personal website
 Symbiotic Project on Affective Neuroscience website
 Documentary film clip (4 min)

Living people
American neuroscientists
Stanford University Department of Psychology faculty
Year of birth missing (living people)